The 1920 Bremen state election was held on 6 June 1920 to elect the 120 members of the Bürgerschaft of Bremen.

Results

References 

Bremen
1920
June 1920 events